Emad Shargi is an Iranian-American businessman. On April 23, 2018, during a trip to Iran, Shargi and his wife were taken into custody by Iranian authorities and held in Evin prison. Emad Shargi was taken to a Tehran court on November 30, 2020, where he was informed that he had been convicted of espionage without a trial and sentenced to 10 years in prison. Iran does not recognize dual citizenship, depriving prisoners like Shargi of consular assistance and diplomatic access.

The families of the American nationals imprisoned in Iran called for the Biden administration to prioritize their return in negotiations. A U.S. official said the Biden administration is treating the issue of the detainees independently from the Iran nuclear deal negotiations and are trying to resolve it as soon as possible.

In 2022, Emad's sister, Neda, joined the steering committee of the Bring Our Families Home campaign to further raise awareness of Emad's detention and other Americans deemed hostages or wrongful detainees.

See also 
List of foreign nationals detained in Iran
Human rights in the Islamic Republic of Iran

References 

Living people
American people imprisoned in Iran
Year of birth missing (living people)